Temple of Heaven East Gate station is a station on Line 5 of the Beijing Subway. The station's name refers to the east gate of the Temple of Heaven, where it is located.

Station Layout 
The station has an underground island platform.

Exits
There are three exits, lettered A2, B, and C. Exits B and C are accessible.

References

External links
 

Beijing Subway stations in Dongcheng District
Railway stations in China opened in 2007